Bob Zimmer  (born October 20, 1968) is a Canadian politician who has been the member of Parliament (MP) for Prince George—Peace River since May 2, 2011, as a member of the Conservative Party.

Background 
Zimmer was born in Dawson Creek and grew up in Fort St. John. After graduating from North Peace Secondary School in 1986, he worked as a welder's assistant in the oil industry. Through the Northern Lights College he became a journeyman carpenter and operated a small construction business between 1995 and 1998. In the 1990s he moved to the Fraser Valley to play in the British Columbia Rugby Union. Between 1999 and 2003 he attended Trinity Western University, where he coached varsity rugby and graduated with a bachelor's degree in Human Kinetics. He completed a 12-month teaching degree at the University of British Columbia and moved back to Fort St. John where he accepted a teaching job at the North Peace Secondary School.

Political career 
Zimmer joined the Reform Party of Canada in 1988. He has cited Ralph Klein and Preston Manning as his political role models. While living in Abbotsford he campaigned for Randy White who was elected as a Reform Party member of parliament. Back in Fort St. John he joined the Conservative Party Prince George-Peace River Electoral District Association and worked as its president until 2009 when he became its secretary and CEO. After long-time Member of Parliament Jay Hill announced he would not seek re-election an election was held for the riding's Conservative Party nomination. In August 2010 Zimmer resigned from his duties in the Electoral District Association and announced he would stand in the nomination election. Five other people stood in the election, including fellow Fort St. John teacher Dan Davies and the former mayor of Prince George Colin Kinsley. With 1,350 votes cast in the March 2011 preferential vote, Zimmer won the nomination in the sixth round.

Member of Parliament 
The next federal election was held in May 2011, when Zimmer faced former provincial politician Lois Boone for the NDP, Prince George lawyer Ben Levine for the Liberal Party of Canada, and physiotherapist Hilary Crowley for the Green Party. During the campaign Zimmer said he would advocate for reduced spending until the federal budget was balanced but also lobby to direct federal funds to widen Highways 2 and the Alaska Highway to four lanes between the Alberta border and Fort St. John. He noted that he believed pensions for former politicians were too high and that he would seek pension reform. Zimmer won the election with 62.12 per cent of the vote.

During the 2015 federal election, Zimmer opposed another study into murdered and missing Aboriginal women during a heated local candidates debate, saying 42 previous studies had already been done and that a primary problem, as stated in the RCMP report, was economic status or lack of a job.  After the debate, the Union of BC Indian Chiefs called for Zimmer to step down as a candidate.  Zimmer had stated that, "One of the major drivers of missing and murdered aboriginal women is the lack of economic activity, or simply put, the lack of a job. … Ultimately, when people have a job, they're not in despair. They can stay on reserve, and that's where we want them to be, we want them to be happy where they live."  President of the Union of BC Indian Chiefs, Grand Chief Stewart Philip, characterized Zimmer's remarks as "simplistic" and "unacceptable". Zimmer later clarified his comments, stating that he was referencing the RCMP's report on Missing and Murdered Aboriginal Women which lists employment status as one of the risk factors of murdered Aboriginal women. Zimmer went on to say that, "I absolutely care about missing and murdered Aboriginal women and want to see it stopped. I have a wife and a daughter and a mother and it is a tragedy that we need to fix."

Zimmer was re-elected with over 50% of the vote, and his Conservative Party formed the Official Opposition for the 42nd Canadian Parliament. Zimmer was appointed to be the deputy critic of Families, Children and Social Development (to Karen Vecchio). In May 2016, Zimmer sponsored and brought forward in the House of Commons a petition with 25,000 signatures advocating for the de-restriction of the AR-15 semi-automatic modern sporting rifle. A month later, when that weapon was used in the Orlando nightclub shooting, the petition and Zimmer's advocacy were criticized. In the May 2017 Conservative Party leadership election Zimmer endorsed Andrew Scheer. Following Scheer's victory, he moved Zimmer to deputy critic of the Treasury Board. On April 6, 2017, Zimmer introduced his first private member bill, Bill C-346 An Act to amend the Firearms Act (licences) which would eliminate the expiry of firearms licences, with a mandatory provision that the licence holder update his or her relevant information every 10 years. The bill was debated but defeated at the second reading stage in November 2017 with only the Conservative Party voting in favour.

In October 2019 he was re-elected again, this time with just shy of 70% of the vote. On November 29 Andrew Scheer named him to the Shadow Cabinet as Shadow Minister for Northern Affairs and Northern Economic Development Agency.

Conversion Therapy Controversy 
On Oct. 28, 2020, Zimmer was one of seven Members of Parliament who voted against a bill (C-6) to add the following offences to the Criminal Code:

(a) causing a person to undergo conversion therapy against the person's will;

(b) causing a child to undergo conversion therapy;

(c) doing anything for the purpose of removing a child from Canada with the intention that the child undergo conversion therapy outside Canada;

(d) advertising an offer to provide conversion therapy; and

(e) receiving a financial or other material benefit from the provision of conversion therapy.

Zimmer faced backlash from constituents on social media and subsequently blocked those who publicly criticized him, reinvigorating the use of the #BlockedByBob hashtag created when Zimmer blocked constituents who criticized him previously over his actions on Twitter. Numerous studies show that conversion therapy leads to consequences including depression and suicidal thoughts. Zimmer has defended his vote against Bill C-6 because he said it "leaves open the possibility that voluntary conversations between individuals and their parents, family members, pastors, teachers, or their counsellors may be criminalized." However, Bill C-6 does not criminalize voluntary conversations about sexuality and sexual orientation.

Electoral results

References

External links 
 Official Website
 

1968 births
Canadian schoolteachers
Conservative Party of Canada MPs
Living people
Members of the House of Commons of Canada from British Columbia
People from Dawson Creek
People from Fort St. John, British Columbia
Trinity Western University alumni
University of British Columbia Faculty of Education alumni
21st-century Canadian politicians